William Joseph Wallace (2 August 1878 – 2 March 1972) was a New Zealand rugby union footballer and foundryman. Wallace won his first Test cap for New Zealand on 15 August 1903 against Australia. He was a member of the legendary 1905 Original All Blacks and played in the famous Match of the Century against Wales. In total he played 51 matches for the All Blacks including 11 internationals.

Following the death of Loftus Armstrong in 1959, Wallace was the oldest living All Black.

Wallace died in Wellington in 1972 and was buried at Karori Cemetery.

References

1878 births
1972 deaths
Rugby union players from Wellington City
New Zealand rugby union players
New Zealand international rugby union players
Wellington rugby union players
Otago rugby union players
Rugby union fullbacks
Burials at Karori Cemetery